Tobias Alexander Edward Manderson-Galvin (born 19 August 1984) is an Australian actor, satirist, performance poet, and playwright.

He is best known as co founder and CEO/Artistic Director of Melbourne's new writing theatre: MKA: Theatre of New Writing.

Summary
Manderson-Galvin's distinctive theatre runs the gamut from docu-drama to black comedy, vaudeville to hyper-realism making him a notable Australian theatre maker. He's also distinguished by his increasingly large body of work. Manderson-Galvin writes and appears in much of his theatre also directing the majority of it. For inspiration, Manderson-Galvin draws heavily on his training as a ballet dancer, philosophy, sociology, and his Jewish and Irish heritage. He's performed on stages diverse as Radio National, pool halls, the National Theatre, Melbourne and a kiddy pool full of jelly under a bridge in Northcote.

In 2010 he won the Munster Poetry Slam Champion and placed in the finals of the All-Ireland Poetry Slam. His poetry, whilst usually live has been published in Herding Kites, a ten-year anthology of the National Young Writers' Festival, a festival at which he was a regular guest and performer.

Selected stage works
Doppelgangster's TITANIC (2015–16), co-writer + performer, Doppelgangster, (Cardiff, Experimentica; Paris, ArtCOP21; Aberystwyth, Site2Safle2 Festival; Melbourne, Hot!Hot!Hot! Festival)
Baby (2016), Playwright + Performer, MKA: Theatre of New Writing + Doppelgangster, VAULT Festival 
Lucky (2015), Playwright, MKA: Theatre of New Writing in association with Melbourne Theatre Company's NEON Festival
Please Don't Talk About Me When Im Gone (2015), Playwright, MKA: Theatre of New Writing + Les Foules, VAULT Festival
(Winner, Outstanding New Production, Vault Awards)
Thank You, Thank You Love (2014), Playwright, Director, Performer, MKA: Theatre of New Writing + HYPRTXT Festival
Soma (2013), Playwright + Performer, MKA: Theatre of New Writing
The Economist  (2011), Playwright, MKA: Theatre of New Writing
Dogmeat (2010)+(2014), Playwright + Performer, MKA: Theatre of New Writing

References

1984 births
Australian people of Irish descent
Male actors from Canberra
Male actors from Melbourne
Living people